David Dancrade (born 18 January 1976) is French heavyweight kickboxer, fighting out of Bonneuil Muaythai Club and Faucon Gym, both based in France. Dancrade is the former Boxing and Muay Thai champion of France. He had his K-1 debut at K-1 World Grand Prix 2007 Final, at the fight up against Japanese kickboxer Musashi in which he suffered a KO at first round.

Titles
2010 World Kickboxing vice Champion 
2006 K-1 Fighting Network in Marseilles 3rd place
2004 French Muay Thai Champion
2003 French Muay Thai Champion
2002 WKA Amateur World Championships in Italy  
2001 French Kickboxing Champion
2000 W.A.K.O. Amateur European Championships in Jesolo, Italy  −75 kg (Low-Kick)
2000 French Kickboxing Vice Champion (A Class)
1998 French Kickboxing Champion (B Class)
1997 French kickboxing Champion (C Class)

See also
Boxing
List of K-1 events
List of male kickboxers

References

External links
 K-1 Official website
 Faucon GYM Official website 
 MMA Madness Profile

1976 births
Living people
French male kickboxers
Heavyweight kickboxers
French Muay Thai practitioners